Krisztián Adorján Gábor (born 19 January 1993) is a Hungarian professional footballer who plays as a forward or a secondary striker for Budafok.

Club career

Early career
Adorján started his career with MTK Budapest before joining Liverpool in 2009.

Groningen
In the summer of 2013, it was officially announced that he was loaned out to Groningen, in the Eredivisie. He made his debut against NEC Nijmegen in a 4-1 win. He scored his first league goal against Go Ahead Eagles, on 25 August, which was the second goal. The match ended in a 3-3 away draw, where he received a red card in the 68th minute for an elbow. Adorján scored his second goal, the team's third, in injury time during a 4-1 win against RKC Waalwijk.

Novara Calcio
On 1 September 2014, Adorján joined Serie C club, Novara Calcio.

Dundalk 
Adorján was announced as a loan signing for League of Ireland side Dundalk on 1 February 2018.

Budafok
On 25 August 2021, Adorján moved to the first Hungarian club of his professional career, Budafok.

Career statistics

References

External links

Profile at the Budafoki MTE website

Voetbal International profile 

1993 births
Living people
Footballers from Budapest
Hungarian footballers
Association football defenders
Liverpool F.C. players
FC Groningen players
Novara F.C. players
FK Partizani Tirana players
Dundalk F.C. players
Virtus Entella players
Budafoki LC footballers
Eredivisie players
Serie B players
Serie C players
Kategoria Superiore players
League of Ireland players
Nemzeti Bajnokság II players
Hungary youth international footballers
Hungary under-21 international footballers
Hungarian expatriate footballers
Expatriate footballers in England
Hungarian expatriate sportspeople in England
Expatriate footballers in the Netherlands
Hungarian expatriate sportspeople in the Netherlands
Expatriate footballers in Italy
Hungarian expatriate sportspeople in Italy
Expatriate footballers in Albania
Hungarian expatriate sportspeople in Albania
Expatriate association footballers in Ireland
Hungarian expatriate sportspeople in Ireland